The 1956–57 season was the 54th season of competitive football in Belgium. R Antwerp FC won their 4th Division I title. RSC Anderlechtois also entered the 1956–57 European Champion Clubs' Cup as Belgian title holder. The Belgium national football team started their 1958 FIFA World Cup qualification campaign, losing to France and winning against Iceland.

Overview
At the end of the season, K Beeringen FC and R Charleroi SC were relegated to Division II and were replaced in Division I by K Waterschei SV Thor and K Sint-Truidense VV from Division II.
The bottom 2 clubs in Division II (RC Tirlemont and RRC de Bruxelles) were relegated to Division III while both Division III winners (KFC Diest and KSC Eendracht Aalst) qualified for Division II.
The bottom 2 clubs of each Division III league SRU Verviers, Mol Sport, FC Vigor Hamme and RUS Tournaisienne were relegated to the Promotion, to be replaced by Overpeltse VV, RCS Brainois, Aarschot Sport and RC Lokeren from Promotion.

National team

* Belgium score given first

Key
 H = Home match
 A = Away match
 N = On neutral ground
 F = Friendly
 WCQ = World Cup qualification
 o.g. = own goal

European competitions
RSC Anderlecht lost in the first round of the 1956–57 European Champion Clubs' Cup to Manchester United of England (defeat 0-2 at home and defeat 10-0 away).

Honours

Final league tables

Premier Division

 1956-57 Top scorer: Maurice Willems (ARA La Gantoise) with 35 goals.
 1956 Golden Shoe: Victor Mees (R Antwerp FC)

References